James Maness (born May 1, 1963) is a former American football player. He played wide receiver for the Chicago Bears.

References

1963 births
Living people
American football wide receivers
TCU Horned Frogs football players
Chicago Bears players
People from Decatur, Texas
Players of American football from Texas